HMAS Allenwood (FY18) was an auxiliary minesweeper operated by the Royal Australian Navy (RAN) during World War II. She was launched in 1920 by Ernst Wright at Tuncurry, New South Wales, Australia as Allenwood for Allen Taylor and Co. Ltd. The ship operated along the east coast of Australia, and was requisitioned by the RAN on 27 July 1941. She was returned to her owners in 1946 before being wrecked near Norah Head on 14 September 1951.

Operational history
Allenwood operated along the east coast of Australia in the coastal trade for Allen Taylor and Co. Ltd. On 16 September 1941, Allenwood was requisitioned by the RAN on 27 July 1941 for use as an auxiliary and fitted out. She was commissioned on 16 September 1941. During the war, Allenwood was based in Sydney. She was decommissioned into reserve on 31 November 1944 and returned to the owner, Allen Taylor & Co Ltd on 1 October 1946.

Fate

On 14 September 1951, under the command of Captain Boutrup, Allenwood ran aground on a sandbank at Birdie Beach, Munmorah National Park, north of Norah Head, New South Wales, in foggy conditions. The vessel could not be removed from the sandbank and was sold for £601 and dismantled in situ.

Citations

References
Gillett, Ross. Australian  New Zealand warships, 1914–1945, Doubleday, Sydney, 

1920 ships
Minesweepers of the Royal Australian Navy
Shipwrecks of the Central Coast Region
Ships built in New South Wales
1901 – World War I ships of Australia
Interwar period ships of Australia
World War II minesweepers of Australia
Coastal trading vessels of Australia
Wooden steamships of Australia
Maritime incidents in 1951